Intermatic Incorporated is an American manufacturer of time switches headquartered in Spring Grove, Illinois. Intermatic was founded in 1891 in Chicago, Illinois as the International Register Company  to produce fare registers.

The company's founder was A.H. Woodward who held several patents on fare registers (mechanical devices for recording passenger ticket and ridership).

The company introduced its first lighting timer in 1945, and today makes timing and control systems for line and low voltage systems used in residential, commercial, government, and industrial systems.

The company sells the Time-All line of timers for consumer applications.

References 

Electronics companies established in 1891
1891 establishments in Illinois
Companies based in McHenry County, Illinois
Manufacturing companies based in Illinois